Farry may refer to:

Places
Farry Island, largest island in Long Lake in Lanark County in eastern Ontario, Canada

People with the surname
 Anthony Farry, field hockey coach 
 Eithne Farry, British editor
 Frank Farry (born 1972), American politician
 Gabriel Farry (1927–2017), Mayor of Gore, New Zealand
 Jim Farry (1954–2010), Scottish football executive
 John Farry (born 1959), Northern Ireland singer and songwriter
 Marc Farry (born 1959), French golfer
 Stephen Farry (born 1971), Northern Ireland politician

See also
 Farey (disambiguation)
 Fary (disambiguation)